Nikola Stojanović (born 6 November 1983) is a former Macedonian football defender. He played on many positions in defense, or as a defensive midfielder.

Club career

BSK Bujanovac
Born in Skopje, Stojanović started his career with BSK Bujanovac, where he had stayed until 2005, playing in the 3rd level leagues of Serbia.

Dinamo Vranje
After several seasons with team from Bujanovac, Stojanović moved to Dinamo Vranje for the 2005–06 season, and win that competition with new team at the end of season. For the 2006–07 season, in Serbian First League, Stojanović made 22 appearances and scored 2 goals, but his club was relegated to Serbian League East, again. He was loaned to Železničar Vranjska Banja for the 2007–08 season, but also as a member of Dinamo Vranje, which made new promotion to level up. Later he was loaned to Serbian League East club Radnik Surdulica for two times, in 2008, and 2010, but also made 31 appearances for Dinamo Vranje in Serbian First League in the meantime. After the 2010–11 Dinamo was relegated to Serbian League East, and Stojanović changed club.

Radnik Surdulica
Stojanović joined Radnik Surdulica for the 3rd time for the 2011–12 season, but this time as a single player. He made 24 appearances and scored 1 goal for the season. For the next season, he made 22 caps and also scored 1 goal, and Radnik Surdulica made promotion to Serbian First League after 2012–13 season. For 2013–14 season, Stojanović made 24 appearances, and scored 2 goals, against Sinđelić Beograd, and Metalac Gornji Milanovac. Captain of the team from Surdulica has been connected with transfer in Borac Čačak, after tournament "Vlasina 2014". However, he stayed with Radnik, but later he gave up the captain's armband to Miloš Krstić. For the 2014–15 season, Stojanović made 27 league, and 1 cup appearance, and was one of the most constant and most important players for the winning Serbian First league. Stojanović made his SuperLiga debut in the 7th fixture of 2015–16 season, against Radnički Niš, at the age of 31. After the end of 2015–16, Stojanović left the club.

Return to Dinamo Vranje
In summer 2016, Stojanović returned to Dinamo Vranje. After he played several matches at the beginning of the 2016–17 Serbian First League season, he missed the rest of season being with the team optionally as a player-coach. In the winter break off-season, Stojanović was related with KMF BSK. In summer 2017, Stojanović promoted as an assistant coach in Dinamo.

Career statistics

Club

Honours
Dinamo Vranje
Serbian League East (2): 2005–06, 2007–08
Radnik Surdulica
Serbian League East: 2012–13
Serbian First League: 2014–15

Notes & references

External links
 Nikola Stojanović stats at utakmica.rs 
 
 

1983 births
Living people
Footballers from Skopje
Serbs of North Macedonia
Association football defenders
Macedonian footballers
FK Dinamo Vranje players
FK Radnik Surdulica players
Serbian First League players
Serbian SuperLiga players